Bishop of Lismore may refer to:

 The Bishop of Lismore, Ireland, a separate episcopal title which took its name after the town of Lismore in County Waterford, Ireland
 The Bishop of Waterford and Lismore, the successor bishopric
 The Bishop of Lismore, an alternative name for the Bishop of Argyll, Scotland
 The Bishop of the Roman Catholic Diocese of Lismore, New South Wales, Australia